Turčianske Teplice is a town in central Slovakia in the Žilina Region. It is about halfway between Martin and Kremnica. The town's population is around 6,500. The town was the historic center of the Upper Turiec subregion within the Turiec region (comitatus), and now enjoys the status of a capital of the Turčianske Teplice District.

History
The town is one of the oldest spa towns in Europe, and was originally known as Štubnianske Teplice. It was first mentioned in text dating from 1281 when King Ladislaus IV of Hungary granted the lands surrounding the springs to a Count Peter. The spa became popular with royalty, including King Sigismund of Hungary and Emperor Maximilian I of Mexico. The recuperative abilities of the spa were first studied by the University of Halle medical student Jan Lisschoviny.

Štubnianske Teplice was renamed Turčianske Teplice in 1946. In 1951 the town merged with the community of Vieska.

Geography
It lies in the Turiec Basin and is surrounded in proximity by the Greater Fatra, Kremnica, Žiar and Lesser Fatra mountain ranges.

The divisions of the town include:
 Diviaky (1951-1955 and 1971)
 Dolná Štubňa (incorporated in 1971)
 Turčiansky Michal (incorporated in 1971)
 Turčianske Teplice

Demographics
According to the 2001 census, the town had 7,031 inhabitants. 97.98% of inhabitants were Slovaks, 0.67% Czech and 0.37% Germans. The religious make-up was 48.09% Roman Catholics, 30.56% Lutherans, and 17.24% people with no religious affiliation.

Twin towns — sister cities

Turčianske Teplice is twinned with:

 Holešov, Czech Republic
 Havířov, Czech Republic
 Skawina, Poland  
 Wisła, Poland  
 Aranđelovac, Serbia

Notable people
Mikuláš Galanda, a modern painter, graphic designer and illustrator.
Matúš Černák, diplomat
Jozef Lettrich, politician

References

External links

Town website
Spa website

Cities and towns in Slovakia
Spa towns in Slovakia